James F. Howell (born July 14, 1934) is an American former politician in the state of Oklahoma.

Biography
Howell was born in 1934 in Wewoka, Oklahoma.

He served in the Oklahoma State Senate from 1973 to 1987, representing district 42 as a Democrat.

References

1934 births
Living people
Democratic Party Oklahoma state senators
People from Wewoka, Oklahoma
People from Midwest City, Oklahoma